Ronald Brownbill (born 1932), is a male former weightlifter who competed for England.

Weightlifting career
He represented England and won a silver medal in the -56 Kg combined category at the 1958 British Empire and Commonwealth Games in Cardiff, Wales.

He was a member of the Wallasey Athletic Club.

References

1932 births
English male weightlifters
Commonwealth Games medallists in weightlifting
Commonwealth Games silver medallists for England
Weightlifters at the 1958 British Empire and Commonwealth Games
Living people
Medallists at the 1958 British Empire and Commonwealth Games